In chemistry, the tricapped trigonal prismatic molecular geometry describes the shape of compounds where nine atoms, groups of atoms, or ligands are arranged around a central atom, defining the vertices of a triaugmented triangular prism (a trigonal prism with an extra atom attached to each of its three rectangular faces).

It is very similar to the capped square antiprismatic molecular geometry, and there is some dispute over the specific geometry exhibited by certain molecules.

Examples
 is usually considered to have a tricapped trigonal prismatic geometry, although its geometry is sometimes described as capped square antiprismatic instead.
 (Ln = La, Ce, Pr, Nd, Pm, Sm, Eu, Gd, Tb, Dy)

Stereochemistry
Molecular geometry